Brian Belo (born 10 July 1987) is an English television personality and writer. He rose to fame after winning the eighth series of reality series Big Brother. Since then, he has become an internet columnist for entertainment magazine, Heat magazine, as well as a TV segment entertainer for Harry Hill's TV Burp and Big Brother's Big Mouth.

Career

Big Brother 
Belo entered the Big Brother house on 15 June 2007. He was noted for his apparent ignorance with regard to William Shakespeare, claiming that he had never heard of the playwright. Belo was announced as the winner of the series on 31 August 2007, with 60% of the vote to win. Until 2018, Belo was the youngest winner of the series.

Post Big Brother
Within a month of leaving Big Brother, Belo made his stage debut as the Guardian Angel in The Vegemite Tales opposite Jonathon Dutton and Blair McDonough at The Venue off Leicester Square. Belo then made a cameo appearance a 2007 episode of Hollyoaks; he expressed his enjoyment of the series whilst in Big Brother. Belo later became a regular on the ITV comedy show Harry Hill's TV Burp, where he gives his thoughts on the week's television. Along with Harry, he sings, "Ebony. And Ivory. Side by side by the piano keyboard. Oh Lord, why don't we . . . ", and Harry sprayed him with a stinger. Belo returned to the Big Brother franchise when making a brief appearance in E4's Big Brother: Celebrity Hijack, in which Chris Moyles sent him into the house to surprise the housemates. Belo performed segments of Shakespeare's plays as part of Stratford-upon-Avon's Shakespeare Aloud initiative in March 2008 in order to bring the works to a wider audience. In July 2008, he released a single, entitled Essex Boy, which failed to chart. In October 2008, Belo appeared in TV horror series Dead Set, both as himself and as a zombie. From June 2009 onwards, Belo became a columnist for Heat Magazine's website, documenting the events of the tenth series of Big Brother and he also featured regularly on Big Brother's Big Mouth. In order to commemorate the tenth year of Big Brother, Belo temporarily returned to the house in July 2009 to participate in a task alongside Charlie Drummond. In October 2010, Belo appeared on Gayle Tuesday: The Comeback. In 2011, Brian appeared on Celebrity Coach Trip, alongside fellow Big Brother contestant, Spencer Smith, whom appeared in Series 3.  They finished runners up.

Big Brother 16
In June 2015, Belo returned to Big Brother as part of a "Time Warp" twist. He was sent in with other former housemates; Big Brother 15 winner Helen Wood and Big Brother 7 finalist Nikki Grahame. They all later entered the Main House on Day 34. Belo's stay in the House was surrounded in controversy, mainly due to the heated arguments between him and fellow guest, Wood. He voluntarily left on 23 June 2015 (Day 43) by climbing out of the House after an argument with Wood.

References

External links 
 Brian Belo on IMDb

1987 births
Living people
Big Brother (British TV series) winners
English people of Nigerian descent
English television personalities